Vesperinae is a subfamily of beetles in the family Vesperidae. It contains two monotypic tribes, Vesperini and Vesperoctenini.

Tribes and genera
 Tribe Vesperini Mulsant, 1839
 Genus Vesperus Dejean, 1821
 Tribe Vesperoctenini Vives, 2005
 Genus Vesperoctenus Bates, 1891

References

Vesperidae
Beetle subfamilies